Mark Browne may refer to:

Mark Browne (footballer) (born 1954), Australian rules footballer
Mark Browne (politician) (born 1993), Canadian politician
Mark Browne, member of Clock
Mark Browne, character in Agnes Browne
Mark Browne, 9th Viscount Montagu (1745–1797)

See also
Mark Brown (disambiguation)
Marc Brown (disambiguation)